The designation of the oldest mosques in the world requires careful use of definitions, and must be divided into two parts, the oldest in the sense of oldest surviving building, and the oldest in the sense of oldest mosque congregation. Even here, there is the distinction between old mosque buildings that have been in continuous use as mosques, and those that have been converted to other purposes; and between buildings that have been in continuous use as mosques and those that were shuttered for many decades. In terms of congregations, they are distinguished between early established congregations that have been in continuous existence, and early congregations that ceased to exist. Note that the major regions, such as Africa and Eurasia, are sorted alphabetically, whereas the minor regions, such as Arabia and South Asia, are sorted by the dates in which their first mosques were reportedly established, more or less, barring those that are mentioned by name in the Quran.

To be listed here a site must:
be the oldest mosque in a country, large city (top 50), or oldest of its type (denomination, architectural, etc.);
be the oldest congregation of its type (denomination).

Mentioned in the Quran 
The following are treated as the oldest mosques or sanctuaries mentioned in the Quran:

Africa

Americas

Asia



Europe

Oceania

See also 
List of oldest minarets
List of tallest minarets
 Holiest sites in Islam
 Islamic architecture
 List of mosques in India
 Congregational mosque
 List of largest mosques
 List of mosques
 List of oldest known surviving buildings
 List of oldest church buildings
 List of oldest synagogues

Notes

References

External links 
 International Architecture database
 Al-Masjid al-Haram and al-Masjid al-Aqsa as the First and Second Mosques on Earth

Historic preservation
Mosques
Mosque architecture
Religion-related lists of superlatives
 Oldest